Between Rounds is an 1899 painting by American artist Thomas Eakins, Goodrich #312. It is part of the collection of the Philadelphia Museum of Art.

Studies

See also
 1899 in art

References

External links
 

1899 paintings
Boxing in art
Paintings by Thomas Eakins
Paintings in the collection of the Philadelphia Museum of Art
Sports paintings